Zhou Botong is a fictional character in the wuxia novels The Legend of the Condor Heroes and The Return of the Condor Heroes by Jin Yong. A member of the Quanzhen School, he is highly-skilled in martial arts, having been trained by his senior, Wang Chongyang, the school's founder. Although he is already in his old age, he is still known for behaving childishly and constantly seeking fun, hence he is nicknamed "Old Imp". At the end of the second novel, he takes the central position of the Five Greats, the five most powerful martial artists in the jianghu (martial artists' community), to replace his deceased senior.

Fictional character biography

The Legend of the Condor Heroes 
Zhou Botong makes his first appearance when the protagonist, Guo Jing, visits Peach Blossom Island, where Zhou Botong has been trapped for 15 years in the midst of a conflict with the island's master, Huang Yaoshi. He meets Guo Jing by chance, tells him about the history of the jianghu (martial artists' community) and the highly coveted martial arts book Nine Yin Manual. He becomes sworn brothers with Guo Jing and teaches him two of his skills, the Seventy-two Styles Vacant Fist and Technique of Ambidexterity, and makes Guo Jing memorise part of the Nine Yin Manual. With the help of Guo Jing and Huang Yaoshi's daughter Huang Rong, Zhou Botong resolves his conflict with Huang Yaoshi, and leaves the island with them.

Towards the end of the novel, it is revealed that Zhou Botong had a secret affair with Duan Zhixing's concubine, Liu Ying, and had impregnated her. However, he broke up with her without knowing about her pregnancy after Wang Chongyang forced him to. Liu Ying gave birth to an unnamed son, who was murdered by a masked Qiu Qianren. When Zhou Botong finds out the truth from Liu Ying, he runs away and disappears to avoid dealing with this troubling matter.

The Return of the Condor Heroes 
Zhou Botong makes brief appearances in the second novel. He meets Xiaolongnü by chance and teaches her the Technique of Ambidexterity when both of them are trapped in a cave by the villain, Jinlun Guoshi. In return, Xiaolongnü teaches him how to control the jade bees and cures him after he is poisoned by Jinlun Guoshi's ice spiders.

Later, with help from the protagonist Yang Guo, Zhou Botong meets Liu Ying, Duan Zhixing and Qiu Qianren again. He forgives a dying Qiu Qianren for killing his infant son, and reconciles his past differences with Liu Ying and Duan Zhixing. He also briefly participates in the Battle of Xiangyang against Mongol invaders.

Martial arts and skills
 Seventy-two Styles Vacant Fist: Zhou Botong created this skill to counter Hong Qigong's Eighteen Subduing Dragon Palms. He teaches Guo Jing this skill.

 Technique of Ambidexterity: Zhou Botong created this skill when he was trapped on the island. Feeling bored, he decided to fight with himself by using a different martial art technique for each hand. In the process, he trained himself to be ambidextrous, which proves useful in dealing with multiple opponents. He teaches Guo Jing and Xiaolongnü this skill.

 Nine Yin Manual : Zhou Botong was forbidden by his senior Wang Chongyang from practicing the skills in the Nine Yin Manual. However, when he met Guo Jing he decided to read the manual and teach Guo Jing in order to counter Huang Yaoshi, who imprisoned him on the Peach Blossom Island for 15 years. Since Guo Jing required demonstrations and Zhou Botong was a fast learner, he learned the skills in the manual without intending to do so. Years later, he apparently forgot these skills after making an effort to do so, believing them to be too dangerous.

In other media 
Notable actors/actresses who have portrayed Zhou Botong in films and television series include Philip Kwok (1977–1981), Carina Lau (1993), Liu Kai-chi (1993) and Wayne Lai (1994–1995).

Zhou Botong was a playable character in the 2008 PC fighting game Street Fighter Online: Mouse Generation.

Notes

Literary characters introduced in 1959
Jin Yong characters
The Legend of the Condor Heroes
The Return of the Condor Heroes
Condor Trilogy
Fictional wushu practitioners
Fictional Song dynasty people
Fictional Han people
Fighting game characters